The Westmorland or Westmoreland was a 26-gun British privateer frigate, operating in the Mediterranean Sea against French shipping in retaliation for France's opposition to Great Britain in the American Revolutionary War.

Service history

The most notable incident in the life of the Westmorland occurred shortly after she sailed for Britain from Livorno under Captain Michael Wallace late in 1778, carrying a large monetary payment for her inbound cargo of salt cod from Newfoundland (Livorno was a trade hub for this commodity), food goods, and 57 crates of artistic objects collected by Grand Tourists such as the Duke of Gloucester, Sir John Henderson and the Duke of Norfolk.

In January 1779, she was given chase by four French ships, comprising two men-of-war, the Caton (64) and the Destin (74), and two smaller vessels.  Wallace attempted to outsail them but, outgunned as he was, soon felt he had little option but to allow the French to board his ship. She was then allowed by Spain (then friendly with France though not yet — in formal terms at least — at war with Britain) to continue to Málaga.

At Málaga her artistic contents were passed on from the French government to two trading companies with links to Ireland, despite Wallace's protests that the ship was full of "extremely precious goods" (the French had already seized her cash cargo), and the Spanish king was informed by his prime minister, the Count of Floridablanca, of the arrival of the art works. Upon Spain's formal declaration of war, king Charles III secretly bought the art from a syndicate of Madrid merchants for 360,000 silver reales (a discount on their original asking price of 600,000 gold doubloons, but still a considerable sum) and had it brought by cart to the capital. The portraits of Basset and Lord Lewisham, meanwhile, were acquired by the Spanish Prime Minister.

Although the British consul at Cadiz had initially informed the British Admiralty that the Westmorland and her cargo had been seized as legitimate prizes, demands followed from the British ambassador, firmly backed at cabinet level, for the repatriation of the art and (in a prisoner exchange for French and Spanish prisoners taken by the Royal Navy) the crew of the Westmorland. Yet to this day, all these coveted artistic treasures remain the possession of the Prado Museum, the Real Academia, and other Spanish national collections. There were only a few, very limited exceptions: a package of Catholic relics intended for the Duke of Norfolk (which the Spanish returned unopened to the Vatican); and Sir Watkin Williams Wynn's Perseus and Andromeda by Mengs, which ended up in the collection of Catherine the Great at the Hermitage Museum.

In 1784, the £100,000 for which the art had been insured at Livorno were paid out in London.  The Westmorland, for its part, was renamed, re-commissioned into the Spanish fleet, but eventually re-taken in the Caribbean by the British.

In 2012 an exhibition of many of the art works captured was held at the Ashmolean Museum at Oxford University and then traveled to the Yale Center for British Art in New Haven, United States.

Notes

References
 Sánchez-Jáuregui, Maria Dolores, and Wilcox, Scott. The English Prize: The Capture of the Westmorland, An Episode of the Grand Tour. New Haven, CT: Yale University Press, 2012. .
Sánchez-Jáuregui, Maria Dolores. "Two Portraits of Francis Basset by Pompeo Batoni in Madrid". The Burlington Magazine, Vol. 143, No. 1180 (Jul 2001), pp. 420–425.
Trumble, Angus. "Pirates of the Mediterranean: Mining the Cargo of the Westmorland in Madrid". Trinity Today, December 2007, pp 14 to 15
Tremlett, Giles. 'Spaniards looted British art hoard' The Times, 1999.

Privateer ships of Great Britain
Captured ships
Museo del Prado
Art and cultural repatriation